Tommy Gormley is a Scottish film director and producer. He is known for his work on the genres of action, drama and science fiction. Gormley has produced or served as assistant director on films such as Star Trek and Star Wars: The Force Awakens.

He produced or co-produced a number of TV series, including Fringe. Gormley won a British Academy of Film and Television Arts award for outstanding contribution to craft at the 2014 British Academy Scotland Awards.

Early life 
Thomas Matthew Gormley was born on 3 May 1968 in Glasgow, Scotland. The son of Charles Gormley, a Scottish film maker. He attended two schools, St Joseph's primary and St Columba of Iona. He enrolled in the University of Strathclyde.

Gormley credits his father Charles Gormley for inspiring him to get into the film industry.

Career

Summary 
Tommy Gormley has been the director of Fringe. And he also featured prominently as the position of Assistant director in Star Wars: The Force Awakens, Star Trek Into Darkness, John Carter (film), Mission: Impossible – Ghost Protocol, Super 8 (2011 film), The Phantom of the Opera (2004 film) and 2012 (film). He is to be an Assistant director for Wonder Woman (2017 film).

Filmography

Films

References

J.J. Abrams congratulates first A.D. Tommy Gormley for BAFTA award, Variety, November 17, 2014. Accessed June 22, 2016.
I was inspired by JJ Abrams and Steven Spielberg, says Scots film director Tommy Gormley by Brian McIver, Glasgow Herald, February 23, 2013. Accessed June 22, 2016.

Scottish film directors
Scottish film producers
1968 births
Living people